Bramwith (WR&G) railway station, which was named Barnby Dun on opening, believed to be 1872, due to its close proximity to the village of that name, took the name Bramwith, (from around 1889), from the village of Kirk Bramwith, near Doncaster, South Yorkshire, England although it was over two miles away. This was possibly to avoid confusion with the station rebuilt on the Manchester, Sheffield and Lincolnshire Railway's straightened line between Doncaster and Thorne. The station was also closer to the village of Thorpe-in-Balne, to the north, than Kirk Bramwith. It was located at the level crossing near the junction of North Field Lane with Bramwith Lane, east of the River Don Navigation.

The station was built by the West Riding and Grimsby Railway but this line (and so the station) never had a regular local passenger service. It was used by excursion passenger trains travelling between the West Riding Woollen District towns and Cleethorpes from opening until the early years of the 20th century, after which it continued as a goods station, traffic being mostly agricultural in nature. The station closed around 1933, but the line is still in use.

References
 "Great Central", Vol 2., G.Dow. Locomotive Publishing Co. 1964

Disused railway stations in Doncaster
Former West Riding and Grimsby Railway stations